Friedeberg is a German surname. Notable people with the surname include:

 Pedro Friedeberg, Mexican painter
 Raphael Friedeberg, German anarchist

 Friedeberg, German name for Mirsk

See also 
 Friedberg (disambiguation)
 Friedeburg

German-language surnames
Jewish surnames
Yiddish-language surnames